Enrique "Quique" González de la Mota Villalba (born 8 July 1984), is a Spanish footballer who played as a central midfielder.

Club career
Born in Málaga, Andalusia, Quique graduated from local Málaga CF's youth system, and made his senior debuts with the reserves in the 2002–03 season, in the Segunda División B. After a loan spell with CD Linares he returned to the B's, and on 29 January 2005 played his first game with the main squad, featuring the last 16 minutes in a 0–3 home loss against Xerez CD in the Segunda División; he spent the 2005–06 campaign with UD Marbella, also on loan.

In 2007 Quique was released by Málaga, and resumed his career in the third level but also in the Tercera División, representing Jerez CF, Lucena CF, Cultural y Deportiva Leonesa, Real Jaén, UD Melilla, CD Guijuelo and CD El Palo.

References

External links
 
 
 

1984 births
Living people
Footballers from Málaga
Spanish footballers
Association football midfielders
Segunda División players
Segunda División B players
Tercera División players
Atlético Malagueño players
Marbella FC players
Lucena CF players
Cultural Leonesa footballers
Real Jaén footballers
UD Melilla footballers
CD Guijuelo footballers